Music Mountain Summer Chamber Music Festival, located on Music Mountain Road in Falls Village, Connecticut, is America's oldest continuing summer chamber music festival.  Founded in 1930, it is currently in its 92nd season.

Mission
Music Mountain's mission is to promote the teaching and performance of the string quartet literature.

History
Music Mountain was founded in 1930 by the violinist Jacques Gordon as the permanent home for the Gordon String Quartet. Music Mountain's mission is the teaching and performance of the string quartet literature. It is known for regularly programming world-famed artists.  Music Mountain also offers a variety of teaching programs each season. Music Mountain's educational and artistic activities were overseen from 1975 until 2017 by Nicholas Gordon, son of founder Jacques Gordon.  In 2016, Oskar Espina-Ruiz, clarinetist, was named Artistic Director.  Board member Ann M. McKinney was elected Interim President upon Nick Gordon's death in October, 2017.

Premises
Music Mountain concerts take place in Gordon Hall, an acoustically perfect chamber music hall. Designed to be the analogue of the violin, the beaming in the ceiling replicates the bass bar and sound post of the violin, the French doors mimic the f holes in the belly of the fiddle.  The shape of Gordon Hall is similar to that of a violin, being long and narrow.  The chamber  itself is completely surrounded by air with hollow walls, a crawl space under the floor and above the ceiling.  There is nothing to impede the ability of the walls, floor and ceiling to vibrate when music is played on the stage.  Gordon Hall seats 335 people (400 with additional seating.)

In addition to Gordon Hall, Music Mountain has 4 houses, each named after an instrument in a string quartet.  The houses were prefabricated buildings ordered from Sears Roebuck and built in 1930.  The property has been listed in the National Register of Historic Places for the impressive architecture of Gordon Hall, and for the relatively rare example of mail-order houses.

Concerts
In the 2016 season, Music Mountain hosted 29 concerts, and additional community events. This included 13 concerts in the Twilight series - including Gilbert and Sullivan, Jazz, Big Band, Broadway, Country, and Folk. The remaining 16 concerts were part of Music Mountain's famous string quartet series, featuring groups such as The St. Petersburg Quartet, The Juilliard String Quartet, The Harlem String Quartet, The Shanghai String Quartet, and many more.  Concerts from prior seasons and the current season can be heard on the internet at www.musicmountain.org or by going to InstantEncore.com.

See also

National Register of Historic Places listings in Litchfield County, Connecticut

References

External links
Music Mountain web site

Chamber music festivals
Music festivals in Connecticut
National Register of Historic Places in Litchfield County, Connecticut
Buildings and structures in Litchfield County, Connecticut
Canaan, Connecticut